Peter Filandia (born 14 May 1970) is a former Australian rules footballer.

Filandia started his AFL career in 1991 at Essendon FC but left the club at the end of 1993, after playing in the club's 1992 reserves premiership. Filandia won the Gardiner Medal (AFL Reserve grade best and fairest award) with 24 votes in the 1992 season but was deemed ineligible due to being suspended for 2 weeks during the home and away season.

After not playing a senior game the following year he was recruited to the Sydney Swans from Essendon at pick 6 in the 1994 pre-season draft.

Filandia was a regular senior player during his 7 seasons at Sydney and was a crowd favourite but was cut down by serious injuries during this period (2  Knee ACL injuries - 1995, 1997)

Following the completion of his AFL career in 2000, Filandia joined Port Melbourne Football Club as its captain and senior assistant coach. 

He was also a runner for the Western Bulldogs for 3 seasons .

Filandia is currently working for AFL SportsReady Ltd managing AFL club traineeships.

References

External links

1970 births
Living people
Australian rules footballers from Victoria (Australia)
Essendon Football Club players
Sydney Swans players
Doutta Stars Football Club players
Port Melbourne Football Club players